10415 Mali Lošinj, provisional designation , is a dark background asteroid and very slow rotator from the outer region of the asteroid belt, approximately 16 kilometers in diameter. It was discovered by Croatian astronomer Korado Korlević at Višnjan Observatory, Croatia, on 23 October 1998. The asteroid was named after the Croatian town of Mali Lošinj.

Orbit and classification 

Mali Lošinj orbits the Sun in the outer main-belt at a distance of 2.9–3.1 AU once every 5 years and 2 months (1,887 days). Its orbit has an eccentricity of 0.03 and an inclination of 14° with respect to the ecliptic. The first used precovery was obtained at Goethe Link Observatory in 1962, extending the asteroid's observation arc by 36 years prior to its discovery. The first unused observations were made at Heidelberg Observatory in 1925.

Physical characteristics 

The asteroid has also been characterized as an X-type asteroid by Pan-STARRS photometric survey.

Slow rotators 

In September 2013, photometric observations at the Palomar Transient Factory in California gave a rotational lightcurve that showed a period of  hours with a brightness amplitude of 0.48 in magnitude. Mali Lošinj is a slow rotator, as asteroids of this size usually rotate within hours once around its axis.

Diameter and albedo 

According to the surveys carried out by NASA's Wide-field Infrared Survey Explorer and its subsequent NEOWISE mission, Mali Lošinj measures between 13.5 and 16.2 kilometers in diameter and its surface has an albedo between 0.13 and 0.15. The Collaborative Asteroid Lightcurve Link assumes a standard albedo for carbonaceous asteroids of 0.057 and calculates a somewhat larger diameter of 18.8 kilometers with an absolute magnitude of 12.36.

Naming 

This minor planet was named after the Croatian town of Mali Lošinj, located on the island of Lošinj, in the northern Adriatic Sea. The island and the town are well known for its nautical school and the Leo Brener Observatory. The minor planet 10645 Brač is also named after a Croatian island in the Adriatic Sea. The approved naming citation was published by the Minor Planet Center on 15 December 2005.

References

External links 
 Asteroid Lightcurve Database (LCDB), query form (info )
 Dictionary of Minor Planet Names, Google books
 Asteroids and comets rotation curves, CdR – Observatoire de Genève, Raoul Behrend
 Discovery Circumstances: Numbered Minor Planets (10001)-(15000) – Minor Planet Center
 
 

010415
Discoveries by Korado Korlević
Named minor planets
010415
19981023